Book of Love is a 2004 American film written and directed by Alan Brown and starring Frances O'Connor, Simon Baker, and Gregory Smith.

Premise
A young woman named Elaine (Frances O'Connor) and her husband, David Walker (Simon Baker) meet a lonely fifteen-year-old, Chet Becker (Gregory Smith), in an ice-cream shop. Over time, the couple becomes friendly with Chet, who develops a crush on Elaine that culminates in a one-night stand. Elaine later confesses her infidelity to David, and their marriage is destroyed by the affair.

Cast and crew
 Frances O'Connor as Elaine Walker
 Simon Baker as David Walker
 Gregory Smith as Chet Becker
 Bryce Dallas Howard as Heather
 Joanna Adler as Melissa
 Sabrina Grdevich as Lilian
 Ari Graynor as Naomi
  Beth MacDonald as Yoga Instructor
 Brett Tabor as Coach
 Van Hughes as Swimmer #1
 C.J. Aker as Swimmer #2
 Rob Ahrens as Producer
 William Rexer as Director of Photography
 Trevor Ristow as Editor

References

External links
 

2004 films
Films shot in Florida
Films shot in New York (state)
Films shot in New Jersey
2004 comedy-drama films
American comedy-drama films
2000s English-language films
Films directed by Alan Brown
2000s American films